The term cup holder can refer to:

Beverages
 a device in a vehicle that acts as a cup holder
 a drink carrier, used to transport multiple beverages in a fast-food setting
 a coffee cup sleeve

Sports
 a title holder for a sporting event such as the World Cup
 a jockstrap

Computers
 a CD-ROM tray in case of a user error

See also 
 Bottle cage
 Bottle sling